Big John may refer to:

People

In sports
 John Baker (defensive lineman, born 1935) (1935-2007), American National Football League player
 John Cannady (1923–2002), American National Football League player
 John Huard (born 1944), American former National Football League and Canadian Football League player and coach, member of the College Football Hall of Fame
 John Kissell (1923-1992), American National Football League and All-America Football Conference player
 John Macklin (c. 1884-1949), American college football player, multi-sport head coach and athletics administrator
 Big John Mazmanian (1926–2006), American drag racer
 John McCarthy (referee) (born 1962), former referee for the Ultimate Fighting Championship (UFC)
 John Merritt (1926–1983), American football coach
 John R. Richards (1875–1947), American college football player, coach, educator and public administrator
 John Sears (racing driver) (1931-1999), American NASCAR driver
 Big John Studd (1948–1995), professional wrestler
 John Tate (boxer) (1955–1998), American boxer, WBA heavyweight champion (1979-1980)
 John Thompson (basketball) (1941–2020), American two-time NBA championship-winning player and NCAA championship-winning coach
 Jerry Tuite (1966–2003), American former pro wrestler

Musicians
 Big John Bates, Canadian guitarist and singer
 Big John Duncan (born 1958), former guitarist for The Exploited
 John Goodison (musician) behind Big John's Rock And Roll Circus
 Big John Greer (1923–1972), American blues saxophonist and vocalist
 John Patton (musician) (1935–2002), jazz musician
 "Big" John Thomas, member of the Welsh hard rock band Budgie
 John Wallace (musician), bassist and singer
 Big John Wrencher (1923–1977), American blues harmonica player and singer

Other
 John Buscema (1927-2002), American comic book artist
 John Castelle (born 1959), American mobster, a capo of the Lucchese crime family
 John Cornyn (born 1952), U.S. Senator from Texas
 John McMichael (1948-1987), Northern Ireland loyalist killed by the Provisional IRA
 Giovanni "Big John" Ormento, gangster involved in the French Connection
 Big John, bodyguard of rocker Bret Michaels who appeared on Rock of Love with Bret Michaels (season 1)

Other
 "Big John (Ain't You Gonna Marry Me)", a 1961 song by The Shirelles
 "Big John", a working title of the ABBA song "Move On"
 The title character in the country song "Big Bad John", by Jimmy Dean
 Big John Steak & Onion, a sub chain based in Michigan
 A nickname for the John Hancock Center in Chicago, Illinois
 A nickname of the US aircraft carrier 
 "Big John" Cannon, protagonist of the American TV series The High Chaparral
 "Big John" Martin, a main character from the 1976 American TV series Big John, Little John
 Big John Butte, a mountain in Montana
 Big John (dinosaur), fossilized triceratops 
 Big John Bay, Kupreanof Island, Alaska
 Big John Cree, which flows into Big John Bay
 Big John, English influencer- popularizer of the word 'bosh'

See also
 Jon Arthur, the host of the Saturday morning children's radio series Big Jon and Sparkie
 Little John (disambiguation)

Lists of people by nickname